This is a list of current professional boxing rankings, which includes the latest rankings by each one of the sport's four major sanctioning bodies, as well as other well-regarded sites and entities.

Overview 
As professional boxing has four major sanctioning bodies (WBA, WBC, IBF, WBO) each with their own champions, the sport doesn't have a centralized ranking system. The rankings published by these organizations share the trait of not ranking the other organizations' champions, as each one of the sanctioning bodies expects their champion to frequently defend their title against their top-ranked contender. The WBA often has more than one champion, none of which are ranked by the other 3 sanctioning bodies. Their "Super" and "Regular" champions are excluded from the rankings but their "Interim" champion is affixed to the #1 spot. The IBF's protocol is for the top 2 spots in its rankings to remain vacant until two of its other top-ranked contenders face off, at which point the winner takes one of those two places.

In addition to the rankings published by the major sanctioning bodies, the TBRB and The Ring each publish their own independent rankings, not excluding any organizations' champions. The aim of both the TBRB and The Ring is to crown a single champion for each division. These lists are subjective and derived by a committee. Since the 90s, other parties have experimented with objective computerized rankings, but these are sometimes regarded as incapable of accounting for all of boxing's quirks and subtleties. The most widely known computerized rankings are published by BoxRec and updated daily. The following is a list compiling the latest instalment of all the previously mentioned rankings. There are 17 weight classes ranging from Heavyweight to Mini Flyweight.

Current boxing rankings

Heavyweight (201 lbs+ - 91.18 kg+)

Cruiserweight (200 lbs - 90.72 kg)

Light heavyweight (175 lbs - 79.38 kg)

Super middleweight (168 lbs - 76.2 kg)

Middleweight (160 lbs - 72.57 kg)

Super Welterweight (154 lbs - 69.85 kg)

Welterweight (147 lbs - 66.68 kg)

Super Lightweight (140 lbs - 63.5 kg)

Lightweight (135 lbs - 61.23 kg)

Super featherweight (130 lbs - 58.97 kg)

Featherweight (126 lbs - 57.15 kg)

Super bantamweight (122 lbs - 55.34 kg)

Bantamweight (118 lbs - 53.52 kg)

Super flyweight (115 lbs - 52.16 kg)

Flyweight (112 lbs - 50.8 kg)

Light flyweight (108 lbs - 48.99 kg)

Mini flyweight (105 lbs - 47.63 kg)

See also
List of current world boxing champions
List of current women boxing rankings
List of current mixed martial arts champions

References

External links

 WBA rankings
 WBC rankings
 IBF rankings
 WBO rankings
 IBO rankings

 BoxRec rankings
 TBRB rankings
 The Ring rankings

 Boxing rankings at BoxingScene
 Boxing rankings at Box.live
 Boxing rankings at FightNews

Boxing
Rankings